Carl Julius Otto Liebe (24 May 1860 – 21 March 1929) was a Danish jurist who served as Prime Minister of Denmark from 30 March 1920 to 5 April 1920. Liebe  was appointed prime minister after King Christian X had dismissed Carl Theodor Zahle and his cabinet because of dissatisfaction with the amount of land ceded to Denmark in the Schleswig Plebiscite. This use of power by the king, which was based in the Danish constitution, led to the Easter Crisis of 1920, and Otto Liebe was replaced by Michael Pedersen Friis after 5 days. The incident also led to a revision of the Danish constitution later in 1920.

Biography
Carl Julius Otto Liebe was born  in Copenhagen. He was the son of Anna Sophy Pedersen and Carl Christian Vilhelm Liebe. His father was a prominent lawyer and politician. He graduated  from Metropolitanskolen in 1877 and became cand.jur. from the University of Copenhagen in 1882. He was a Supreme Court Attorney 1885 and Supreme Court Attorney in 1889. From  1910 until 1919,  he served as chairman of the Danish Bar Association. Liebe became Knight of the Order of the Dannebrog 1900, Dannebrogsmand 1906, Commander of the 2nd degree 1917 and of the 1st degree 1920. In 1927 he received the Grand Cross.

References

1860 births
1929 deaths
People from Copenhagen
University of Copenhagen alumni
Grand Crosses of the Order of the Dannebrog
Danish jurists
Danish Justice Ministers
Prime Ministers of Denmark
Politicians from Copenhagen
20th-century Danish politicians
Burials at the Garrison Cemetery, Copenhagen